Phil Bates (born September 20, 1989) is an American football wide receiver for the Saskatchewan Roughriders of the Canadian Football League (CFL). He was most recently a member of the Toronto Argonauts of the Canadian Football League. He played college football at Ohio. He was signed by the Seattle Seahawks as an undrafted free agent in 2012. With the Seahawks, he won Super Bowl XLVIII against the Denver Broncos.

College career
Bates played college football at Iowa State University as a quarterback and wide receiver from 2007 to 2008. He then transferred to Ohio University, where he played from 2009 to 2011. He finished his career with 457 passing yards, five passing touchdowns, 738  rushing yards, three rushing touchdowns, 270 receiving yards, and one receiving touchdown.

Professional career

Seattle Seahawks
Bates was signed by the Seattle Seahawks after going undrafted in the 2012 NFL Draft.

On September 1, 2014, Bates was waived. He was signed to the Seahawks practice squad on September 9, 2014.

Cleveland Browns
On October 30, 2014, the Cleveland Browns signed Bates to their practice squad.

On December 27, 2014, Bates was called up from the Browns practice squad to their active roster for their season finale against the Baltimore Ravens after Josh Gordon was suspended by the team after failing to attend a team walk-through. He was released by the Browns on May 11, 2015.

Dallas Cowboys
Bates was signed by the Dallas Cowboys on August 20, 2015. He was released by the Cowboys on September 1, 2015.

Toronto Argonauts
Bates joined the Toronto Argonauts of the Canadian Football League in the second half of the 2015 CFL season. Besides seeing playing time late in the season, he also played in the East Division semi-final loss to the Hamilton Tiger-Cats on November 15, 2015. Bates played in only five of the Argos first 14 games, catching three passes for 20 yards with one touchdown. Following a Week 15 loss the Argos, the front office decided to release four of their wide receivers on the same day including Phil Bates. Reports suggest the four wide receivers were not committed to the Argos and had been a source of division in the locker room for some time.

References

External links
Toronto Argonauts bio
Seattle Seahawks bio
Ohio Bobcats bio
Iowa State Cyclones bio

1989 births
Living people
Sportspeople from Omaha, Nebraska
Players of American football from Nebraska
African-American players of American football
African-American players of Canadian football
American football wide receivers
American football quarterbacks
Canadian football wide receivers
Iowa State Cyclones football players
Ohio Bobcats football players
Seattle Seahawks players
Cleveland Browns players
Toronto Argonauts players
Omaha North High School alumni
21st-century African-American sportspeople
20th-century African-American people